Eugène Boban or Boban-Duvergé (1834–1908) was a French antiquarian. He was the official archaeologist of the court of Maximilian I of Mexico, and a member of the French Scientific Commission in Mexico. From time to time he sold crystal skulls, one which is now in the Musée du Quai Branly and another in the British Museum.

Career
Eugène Boban went to Mexico in 1857, and became fluent in both Spanish and Nahuatl. He headed an expedition commissioned by Napoleon III to collect Mexican art and artifacts, later exhibited at the Trocadéro Museum in connection with the International Exposition (1867). In 1885 he had published a poster, Cuadro arqueológico y etnográfico de la republica mexicana. In July 1886, he moved his business to New York City. Two sale catalogues of his collection, catalogued by Ed. Frossard, were published in New York in 1887. In 1891, he organized and published the Aubin-Goupil Collection of manuscripts, bought in 1889 by Eugène Goupil and now in the Bibliothèque nationale. Ethnological objects from his collection were sold at Paris in 1908.

Questions of authenticity
A crystal skull originally sold by Boban, now in the British Museum, has been demonstrated to be a modern fake.

Published works
Boban's published works include:
 Eugéne Boban Antiquités mexicaines Paris, E. Leroux, 1875
 Bibliographie palèoethnologique 1881
 Cuadro arqueológico y etnográfico de la republica mexicana Mexico, Imp. de Muriga, 1885
 E. Boban Documents pour servir à histoire du Mexique Paris, E. Leroux,  1891
Histoire de la nation Mexicaine 1893

Notes

References

 
 
 
 
 
 
 

1834 births
1908 deaths
French antiquarians
Archaeological forgery
French Mesoamericanists
19th-century Mesoamericanists
Mesoamerican art collectors
French male non-fiction writers
Writers from Mexico City
19th-century French male writers
Crystal skull
French expatriates in Mexico